Events from the year 1593 in Ireland.

Incumbent
Monarch: Elizabeth I

Events
June 14 – English explorer John Davis in the Desire makes landfall at Berehaven at the conclusion of the second Cavendish expedition.
June 23 – in a skirmish at Skeanavart in County Roscommon as part of Hugh Maguire (Lord of Fermanagh)'s raid into Connacht, Edmund MacGauran (Roman Catholic Archbishop of Armagh) is among those killed.
Hugh Roe O'Donnell drives the English  sheriff out of Tyrconnell and leads two expeditions against Turlough Luineach O'Neill.
Pirate queen Grace O'Malley meets with Queen Elizabeth I of England at Greenwich.
In Lisbon, John Houling, SJ, and Fr. Peter Fonseca establish the College of St. Patrick for the education of young Irish Roman Catholics.

Births
Thomas Arthur, physician (d. 1666?)
Thomas Fleming, Roman Catholic Archbishop of Dublin (d. 1665)

Deaths
March 4 – Sir William Herbert, Welsh planter in Ireland.
June 23 – Edmund MacGauran, Roman Catholic Archbishop of Armagh (b. c.1547)
Edward Fitz-Symon, Attorney General for Ireland (b. c.1530)
Murrough na dTuadh Ó Flaithbheartaigh, Chief of Iar Connacht.

References

 
1590s in Ireland
Ireland
Years of the 16th century in Ireland